In dynamical systems theory, a period-doubling bifurcation occurs when a slight change in a system's parameters causes a new periodic trajectory to emerge from an existing periodic trajectory—the new one having double the period of the original. With the doubled period, it takes twice as long (or, in a discrete dynamical system, twice as many iterations) for the numerical values visited by the system to repeat themselves.

A period-halving bifurcation occurs when a system switches to a new behavior with half the period of the original system.

A period-doubling cascade is an infinite sequence of period-doubling bifurcations. Such cascades are a common route by which dynamical systems develop chaos. In hydrodynamics, they are one of the possible routes to turbulence.

Examples

Logistic map
The logistic map is 
 
where  is a function of the (discrete) time .

For  between 1 and 3,  converges to the stable fixed point . As  grows larger, oscillations between 4 values, then 8, 16, 32, etc. appear. As  increases, there are some intervals where most starting values will converge to one or a small number of stable oscillations, such as near .

These are single points, rather than intervals. These points are said to be in unstable orbits, since nearby points do not approach the same orbit as them.

quadratic map
Real version of complex quadratic map is related with real slice of the Mandelbrot set.

Kuramoto–Sivashinsky equation

The Kuramoto–Sivashinsky equation is an example of a spatiotemporally continuous dynamical system that exhibits period doubling. It is one of the most well-studied nonlinear partial differential equations, originally introduced as a model of flame front propagation.

The one-dimensional Kuramoto–Sivashinsky equation is

A common choice for boundary conditions is spatial periodicity: .

As  is decreased, the dynamics eventually develops chaos. The transition from order to chaos occurs via a cascade of period-doubling bifurcations, one of which is illustrated in the figure.

Logistic map for a modified Phillips curve

Consider the following logistical map for a modified Phillips curve: 

where :
  is the actual inflation
   is the expected inflation, 
 u is the level of unemployment, 
  is the money supply growth rate. 

Keeping  and varying , the system undergoes period-doubling bifurcations and ultimately becomes chaotic.

Experimental observation
Period doubling has been observed in a number of experimental systems. There is also experimental evidence of period-doubling cascades. For example, sequences of 4 period doublings have been observed in the dynamics of convection rolls in water and mercury. Similarly, 4-5 doublings have been observed in certain nonlinear electronic circuits. However, the experimental precision required to detect the ith doubling event in a cascade increases exponentially with i, making it difficult to observe more than 5 doubling events in a cascade.

See also
List of chaotic maps
Complex quadratic map
Feigenbaum constants
Universality (dynamical systems)
Sharkovskii's theorem

Notes

References

External links
Connecting period-doubling cascades to chaos 
Nonlinear systems
Bifurcation theory